(6-4)DNA photolyase (DNA photolyase, H64PRH, NF-10, phr (6-4), PL-(6-4), OtCPF1, (6-4) PHR, At64PHR) is an enzyme with systematic name (6-4) photoproduct pyrimidine-lyase. This enzyme catalyses the following chemical reaction

 (6-4) photoproduct (in DNA)  2 pyrimidine residues (in DNA)

This enzyme is a flavoprotein.

References

External links 
 

EC 4.1.99